The large moth subfamily Lymantriinae contains the following genera beginning with B:

References 

Lymantriinae
Lymantriid genera B